Samuel Barton (July 27, 1785 – January 29, 1858) was an American politician and a one-term U. S. Representative from New York from 1835 to 1837.

Biography
Barton, a nephew of William H. Vanderbilt, was born in New Dorp, New York on July 27, 1785, the son of Samuel and Jane Vanderbilt Barton, who was the sister of Commodore Vanderbilt. He and attended the common schools, and became an agent for Commodore Cornelius Vanderbilt’s steamship lines. Barton married Lydia Rawson Taylor, and they had one son, Cornelius Vanderbilt Barton.

Career
Having served in the State militia as a major in 1818, Barton was a member of the New York State Assembly from 1821 to 1822. and served on the Andrew Jackson reception committee in 1833. He again served in the State militia as a colonel in 1833.

Congress 
Elected as a Jacksonian to the Twenty-fourth Congress, Barton was a U. S. Representative for the second district of New York from March 4, 1835 to March 3, 1837. He was not a candidate for renomination in 1836.

Later career 
He resumed his former pursuits in the steamship business. He served as director of the Tompkinsville Lyceum.

Death
Barton died in New Dorp, Staten Island, Richmond County, New York, on January 29, 1858 (age 72). He is interred at Moravian Cemetery, New Dorp, Staten Island, New York.

References

External links

1785 births
1858 deaths
Jacksonian members of the United States House of Representatives from New York (state)
19th-century American politicians
Burials at Moravian Cemetery
People from New Dorp, Staten Island
Vanderbilt family
Members of the United States House of Representatives from New York (state)